Andrea Cristini (born 29 July 1994) is an Italian professional footballer who plays as a defender for  club Pro Vercelli.

Club career
A youth product of Torino, Cristini began his professional career with Cuneo. Cristini made his professional debut with Cuneo in a 3–1 Serie C win over Torres on 1 September 2013. He moved to Mantova in 2016, and returned to Cunio in 2019. In 2019, he transferred to Teramo. On 19 September 2020, he signed a 3 year contract with Sambenedettese.

On 10 August 2021, he joined Pro Vercelli.

Personal life
Cristini's parents were both volleyball players. His brother, Marco is also a professional footballer.

References

External links
 
 

1994 births
Living people
People from Venaria Reale
Italian footballers
Association football defenders
Serie C players
A.C. Cuneo 1905 players
F.C. Pavia players
Mantova 1911 players
S.S. Teramo Calcio players
A.S. Sambenedettese players
F.C. Pro Vercelli 1892 players
Footballers from Piedmont
Sportspeople from the Metropolitan City of Turin